Bukama is a town in Haut-Lomami Province of south-eastern Democratic Republic of the Congo. As of 2009 it had an estimated population of 42,718.

Climate
Köppen-Geiger climate classification system classifies its climate as a tropical savanna climate (Aw).

References

Populated places in Haut-Lomami